Amorphophallus dunnii is a species of subtropical tuberous herbaceous plant found in Guangdong and Guangxi provinces of China.

References

External links
 
 

dunnii